The Dancing Fool is a 1932 Fleischer Studios Talkartoon animated short film starring Betty Boop, Bimbo, and Koko the Clown.

Synopsis
Bimbo and Koko are sign painters hired to paint the lettering on the window of "Betty Boop's Dancing School". Betty Boop teaches her animal friends how to dance to the tune of "Dancing to Save Your Soul". The dancing shakes the building, which crumbles to the ground.

References

External links
The Dancing Fool at IMDB
The Dancing Fool at the Cartoon Database
 

1932 films
1930s dance films
Betty Boop cartoons
1930s American animated films
American black-and-white films
1932 animated films
Paramount Pictures short films
Fleischer Studios short films
Short films directed by Dave Fleischer